Nattferd (in English Night Travel)   is the debut album by Norwegian black metal band Ragnarok, released in 1995 under Head Not Found.

Track listing
All the music by Rym. All the lyrics by Thyme, except track 8 by Jerv.

Personnel

Ragnarok 
 Thyme - vocals
 Rym - guitar
 Jerv - bass guitar
 Jontho - drums

Additional personnel 
Pål Espen Johannesen - Keyboards

Production and engineering 
Pål Espen Johannessen - producer and engineer 
Recorded at X-Ray Studios in early 1995.
Produced by Pål E. Johannessen & Ragnarok.
Mastered at Strype Audio in Oslo.

External Links 

 

1995 debut albums
Ragnarok (Norwegian band) albums
Head Not Found albums